永, meaning "eternal", may refer to:
Young (Korean name), also spelled Yeong, Korean family name and given name
Hisashi, Japanese given name

See also
Eight Principles of Yong, the calligraphic principles for writing this character
CJK Unified Ideographs, the Unicode block which contains this character